Bronte College is a private, co-educational day and boarding high school, located in Mississauga, Ontario, Canada. Founded in 1991, Bronte College offers the Ontario Secondary School Diploma (OSSD) to grades 9 through 12. The International Baccalaureate (IB) Diploma Programme is offered in Grade 11 and 12 and Advanced Placement (AP) is offered in Grade 12. The school is located in the heart of Mississauga close to shopping malls, public transit and just 20 minutes to the international airport.

Campus and residence 
Bronte College is located at 88 Bronte College Court. The building boasts modern facilities including a library, auditorium, indoor gymnasium, fitness centre, outdoor field and full-service cafeteria. The eight (8) floor student residence is conveniently located in the same building as the school. There are four floors designated for female students and four floors designated for male students. The residence offers majority single rooms. A homestay program is offered as an extension to the residence building.

Academic programs 
Bronte College has three semester intakes; September, February and July.

The school offers the Ontario Secondary School Diploma (OSSD).

Additional programs offered include:

 International Baccalaureate (IB) Diploma Programme
 Advanced Placement (AP)
 Express Program
 English Language Support

Bronte College is an official test centre for:

 AP (Advanced Placement)
 IELTS (International English Language Testing System)

Summer Camp 
Bronte College offers a Summer Camp program for ages 12–17 in July and August. Two camp programs are offered; English Language and Math & Science Camp. All camps include approximately 3 hours of daily classroom instruction, accommodation, nutritious meals, health insurance, daily activities, and weekend excursions.

References

External links
Bronte College
Boarding schools in Ontario
Educational institutions established in 1991
High schools in Mississauga
Private schools in Ontario
1991 establishments in Ontario